Cyathopsis is a genus of shrubs in the family Ericaceae.  The genus is  endemic to New Caledonia in the Pacific and contains three species that have previously been included in Styphelia. It is related to genera such as Leucopogon, Lissanthe and Styphelia.

Species
, Plants of the World Online accepted three species:
 Cyathopsis albicans 
 Cyathopsis floribunda 
 Cyathopsis violaceospicata

References

Endemic flora of New Caledonia
Ericaceae genera
Epacridoideae
Taxa named by Adolphe-Théodore Brongniart
Taxa named by Jean Antoine Arthur Gris